Street Alcohol Fighter, often abbreviated as SAF is a South Korean variety web show hosted by South Korean singer-songwriter and presenter Kim Hee-chul. The program aired every Thursday at 8 pm KST on YouTube. Its basic premise involves celebrities being interviewed by Kim while drinking alcoholic drinks.

Rule
Before filming Street Alcohol Fighter, each guest was asked about their alcohol tolerance. The main objective of the show is for the guest to enjoy drinking. 

 Drinking games

Series overview

Episodes

Season 1

Season 2

Sing Again 2 special

Alcohol Superstar Challenge

Kim Hee-chul needs to collect 50 liquor drop stickers in order to get a 37.5kg of 24-karat gold cup. The challenge is based on ABV: cheongju 13%, soju 17%, kaoliang liquor 34%, vodka 40%, Jim Beam whiskey 40%, Sikhye 41%.

 1 sticker = 1 bottle of soju
 1 sticker = 3 bottles of beer
 1 sticker = 4 glasses of vodka cocktail
 2 stickers = 1 bottle of kaoliang
 2 stickers = 3 bottles of cheongju
 1 sticker = 2 mugs of Jim Beam whiskey

 Notes
 In episode 5, Kim gets a sticker whenever, he or the guest answered correctly during the Cyworld 100 questions, 100 answers game. 
 In episode 6, Kim and Yerin get 2 stickers if they did a 'love shot' and 'bottoms up' while drinking an espresso martini.

Reverse Challenge
This challenge is a spin-off of the Alcohol Superstar Challenge where Kim Hee-chul gets to remove 50 stickers that he collected previously without calculating the alcohol percentage. The rule of the challenge is to remove 1 sticker for one bottle. By completing this challenge, Kim will received another 37.5kg of 24-karat gold cup.

In season 2, the challenge was renamed as The 13 million Won Wine Challenge. Kim needs to collect 135 liquor drop stickers in order to get the same amount of the 13 million won wine volume. In episode one of season one, the price the wine was 14,214,050 Korean Won. If Kim fails, the other remaining volume will be given to the staff of the show. Kim managed to collect 121 out of 135 liquor drop stickers, 78ml (after round up 77.8ml) are given to the production staff.

Sponsorships
Street Alcohol Fighter openly displays its engagement in product placement within the show. In episode 7, the show received its first sponsorships from Haroutine, a 100% plant-based multivitamin pill. In episode 8, Jim Beam became their first alcoholic beverage sponsor. Other products appear throughout the show are CJ Condition hangover helper, Tsingtao beer, LG Homebrew beer machine, HK inno.N hangover jelly stick, sparking hangover drink Kaesukang, Won soju and Taylor Prunes.

Notes

References

External links

 

2020s South Korean television series
2020s YouTube series
2021 South Korean television series debuts
2022 South Korean television series endings
2021 web series debuts
JTBC original programming
South Korean variety television shows
South Korean television talk shows
South Korean web series
Korean-language television shows
K-pop television series